Klein Flottbek (Botanischer Garten) railway station is on the Altona-Blankenese line and serviced by the Hamburg city trains. Rapid transit trains of lines S1 and S11 of the Hamburg S-Bahn call at the station in the Klein Flottbek subdistrict in the Nienstedten quarter of Altona borough in Hamburg, Germany. The track forms the border of the Osdorf quarter.

The station is near the main entrance of the Botanischer Garten Hamburg, in Osdorf.

Station layout
The station is an at-grade station with an island platform and 2 tracks. Entrance to the platform is through a pedestrian underpass. There are no service personnel attending the station, but an emergency call and information telephone is available. There are about 20 places to lock a bicycle and about 260 park and ride spaces. The station is fully accessible for handicapped persons via a lift. There is a DB Service Store, but no lockers.

Services
The trains travel in the direction of Blankenese and Wedel on track no. 1 and the direction of Hamburg center on track no. 2. A bus station in front of the railway station is used by several bus lines.

See also

Hamburger Verkehrsverbund (HVV)

References

External links

DB station information 
Network plan HVV (pdf) 560 KiB 

Hamburg S-Bahn stations in Hamburg
Buildings and structures in Altona, Hamburg
Hamburg KleinFlottbek